Dieter Vanthourenhout (born 20 June 1985 in Bruges) is a Belgian professional racing cyclist, who currently rides for UCI Continental team . He is the brother of racing cyclist Michael Vanthourenhout.

Vanthourenhout will retire from cycling at the end of 2020, after 14 years as a professional.

Major results

Cyclo-cross

2000–2001
 1st Cadet race, National Championships
2002–2003
 1st Junior race, National Championships
2005–2006
 3rd Under-23 race, National Championships
2006–2007
 2nd Leudelange
 3rd Under-23 race, National Championships
 3rd Dudzele
2007–2008
 3rd Sint-Niklaas
2015–2016
 1st Cyclocross Bredene

Road

2009
 7th Omloop der Kempen
2011
 7th Omloop der Kempen
 9th Dwars door het Hageland
2013
 5th Omloop der Kempen

References

External links
 
 

1985 births
Living people
Belgian male cyclists
Cyclo-cross cyclists
Sportspeople from Bruges
Cyclists from West Flanders